is a Japanese politician of the Liberal Democratic Party, a member of the House of Representatives in the Diet (national legislature). A native of Bunkyō, Tokyo and dropout from Meiji University, he was elected for the first time in 1986 after two unsuccessful runs in 1972 and 1983. In 1993 he left the LDP and participated in the formation of the New Frontier Party in the following year. In 1996 he left the New Frontier Party, rejoining the LDP in the following year. From 2000 to 2001 he was Minister of State for Science and Technology Policy in the cabinet of Yoshirō Mori.

On September 30, 2008, as LDP General Affairs Council Chairman, Takashi Sasagawa suggested that the US House of Representatives rejected a bailout plan because House Speaker Nancy Pelosi is a woman.

He is the second son of the businessman, politician and philanthropist Ryōichi Sasakawa.

References

External links 
  in Japanese.

1935 births
Living people
Politicians from Tokyo
Members of the House of Representatives (Japan)
New Frontier Party (Japan) politicians
20th-century Japanese politicians
Liberal Democratic Party (Japan) politicians
Tokyo gubernatorial candidates
Meiji University alumni
21st-century Japanese politicians